Rairangpur is a city and a tehsil of Mayurbhanj district of the state of Odisha, India. It is located 287 kilometres from the state capital Bhubaneswar, 82 kilometres from the district headquarters of Baripada, and about 73 kilometres from Jamshedpur. Rairangpur is the second largest city in the Mayurbhanj district, a notable mining area of Odisha, producing iron-ore from the Gorumahisani, Badampahar, and Suleipat mines.

The Kharkhai (Suleipat) Dam and the Simlipal Tiger Reserve are the nearby local attractions at an approachable distance, attracting many foreign tourists. 

India's 15th President Smt. Droupadi Murmu belongs from here.

Geography
The city mainly consists of grasslands, rice farms and trees and is guided by a central road for commuters. The villages, buildings, and markets on either side of the road expanded until it hits a few rice farms.

History
Rairangpur Garh, formerly Bamanghaty (Bamunghati) was founded by King Madhabdas Narendra Mohapatra. In the year 1878, Bamanghaty was ruled by King Krushna Chandra Bhanjdeo. 

The Mayurbhanj princely state was the main influence across Rairangpur from the 12th century AD till 1949.

Rairangpur was firstly a part of the Bengal Presidency, then it was a part of the Bihar and Orissa province, and later it became part of the Orissa Province in the era of World War II and the late '30s.

Later in the year 1918, Rairangpur was officially named after Rairangpur Garh.

On 24 April 1960, Rairangpur Notified Area of Council (NAC) was formed with 15 wards.

Then on 1 May 2014, Rairangpur Municipality was formed under the laws as per the Municipalities Act. 1950 notification released by Government of Odisha.

Demographics

According to the 2011 Census of India, Rairangpur has a population of 47,294. Males constitute 52% of the population and females 48%. With an average literacy rate of 72%, higher than the national average of 59.5%: male literacy is 79%, and female literacy is 65%. And 12% of the total population is under 6 years of age.

Economy

Rairangpur acts as a liaison centre between Jamshedpur in Jharkhand, Durgapur in West Bengal and the iron ore mines in Gorumahisani, Badampahar and Suleipat. The steel factories of Tata and the surrounding areas rely partly on the iron ores extracted from these mines. In addition to freight trains, there is also a DEMU passenger train from Jamshedpur to Badampahar via Rairangpur.

As surrounded by hills, iron ore is abundantly found here. The first iron ore mines of Asia were in Gorumahisani, Suleipat and Badampahar (mother mines of Tata Steel). The first ever trial for setting up a "Ferro Vanadium Plant" was made by Mayurbhanj Maharaja during pre-independence days. Currently, thousands of tonnes of iron ore are exported from here on a daily basis.

The majority of the population is dependent on paddy harvesting (farming) as either their main source or as an alternate source of income. The direct and indirect dependency of the economy of this place is largely influenced by paddy harvesting. The same is again largely dependent on the annual rainfall during May–September. The Kharkhai (Suleipat) Dam and The Bankbal Dam irrigate some of the cultivating lands and helps with the kharif harvesting.

It has the oldest and the largest "Sal Oil Extraction Plant" which is non-operational and has been closed for years. The area suffers due to less attention in the political environment with few resources and funds allocated for development from government or private sources.

Climate

Transportation

Rairangpur lies on the Tatanagar-Badampahar branch line of Indian Railways. 
Air conditioned luxurious buses to Bhubaneswar, Cuttack, Keonjhar, Rourkela, Tatanagar and Kolkata are available. Local buses and jeeps are there every fifteen to thirty minutes to all small villages and towns. Important traffic points of the city:
Bazar Golei Chhak
Biju Pattanaik Chhak (Durga Mandap)
Raghunath Murmu Chhak

Rairangpur has its local airstrip namely Dandbose Aerodrome (Rairangpur Airport). In most cases celebrities land here by their chopper.

Culture

Makar Parba is the most popular festival of Odisha, being widely celebrated here with great enthusiasm. As Makar comes once in year, a unique vibe is created among people, they wear new clothes and make Pitha (Rice Cake) in their homes, eat it and distribute to their relatives spreading love and affection.Also village people make Tusu (Cosmic Goddess) represent and them in the nearbyTusu Mela where people gather largely to witness those idols of Tusu.

Other religious festivals : Kumara Purnima, Maha Shivaratri, Raja Parba,
Rath Yatra.

During Rath Yatra (Car Festival), people from all sections of the society pull the Ratha (Chariot) of Lord Jagannath, his brother Lord Balabhadra and sister goddess Subhadra to their Mausibadi (Aunt's place) from the temple.

Uda Parba or Uda Jatra, is a festival of Lord Shiva celebrated here on 15 April, Pana Sankranti every year.

Most commonly Deepawali, Durga Puja, Ganesh Puja and Saraswati Puja's are celebrated all over Rairangpur. Popular idols belongs to Ichinda, Bazar, Kucheibudhi, Anladuba, Sakiladihi and Purnaghaty area.

Chhau dance of this Bamanghati Subdivision is famous all over the world. Jhumar is the local genre.

Places of interest

Jagannath Temple
Hanuman Vatika, Bazar
Birsa Munda Park 
Indira Gandhi Children's Park
Routhkamar Mini Park
Gandhi Park 
Asurghati waterfall 
Mind Shift (Odisha's first VR center)
Suleipat Dam (Kharkhai Dam)
Bankbal Dam
Simlipal National Park
Purunia Shivsambhu Temple
Raghu Nath Jiu Math, Anladuba
Badampahar Mines 
Gorumahisani Mines

Sports and entertainment

Cricket is the most widely played sport in the city. "Deepak Kumar Memorial (DKM)", Mahuldiha organizes a cricket tournament every year. Being the most popular cricket tournament here, teams of different parts of the state and nearby participate and perform their talent. Likewise, "Rairangpur Premier League (RPL)" is also organized at Kacheri Stadium (Rairangpur Stadium).

Sports organised by various village youth associations just after Makar Sankranti is one of the age old sports activity promoting youth athletes with very colorful and festive events during January & February every year.

 Park
Children's Park, Kacheri Road- A heavenly play destination for kids.
Birsamunda Park , Mahuldiha - Another amusement destination for all.

 VR Center
Odisha has now got its first VR Virtual Reality (VR)center at Mind Shift, Rairangpur.Children find it as their favourite place for having all the fun and playing games in a unique way.

Lifestyle and language

Rairangpurians follow a moderate lifestyle and they live in peace and harmony and celebrate various religious festivals together.

Language
Odia is the most common language followed by the locals.
Hindi being the national language.
Santali as a tribal language

Landmarks

 
Most populated areas belong to:
Mahuldiha
Anladuba
Bazar Area
Baidaposi
Bikash Nagar
Garh
Ichinda
Kucheibudhi
Purnaghaty
Pichhilighaty
Sakiladihi
Thakuranibeda

Nationalised banks
Axis Bank
Bandhan Bank
Bank of India
Canara Bank
HDFC Bank
ICICI Bank
IDBI Bank
Oriental Bank of Commerce
Punjab National Bank
State Bank of India
Syndicate Bank
UCO Bank
Union Bank of India

Educational institutions

This place is rapidly growing in the educational infrastructure.
Some of the Government & Private funded educational institutes are :

Government Boys High School
Government Girls High School
Raghu Nath Jiu High School
SSDD Girls' High School (Kanya Aashram), Rairangpur
Pichlighaty High School
Saraswati Shishu Vidya Mandir
Rairangpur College (North Orissa University)
Mahila Mahavidyalaya
Rairangpur ITI (Technical) 
Kerala Public School
Little Flower School
Sparsh Public School
Sunshine English Medium School 
Madina Public School
Kalinga English Medium School
Venketeswar Public School
Fact Computer Education
Kendriya Vidyalaya
Technoworld +2 Sc. College
Odisha Adarsha Vidyalaya, Sanmouda
Cosmos International School
Richard Mission Primary School

Politics
Mr. Abhishek Pattanaik of Biju Janata Dal (BJD) is the chairperson of the Rairangpur Municipality.

Mr. Naba Charan Majhi of Bharatiya Janata Party (BJP) is the present MLA from Rairangpur Assembly Constituency, who recently won elections in 2019.

Previously before the 2019 election, it was Mr. Saiba Sushil Kumar Hansdah of Biju Janata Dal (BJD) in 2014. Previous MLAs from this seat were Mr. Shyam Charan Hansdah of Indian National Congress (INC) in 2009, Mrs. Droupadi Murmu of Bharatiya Janata Party (BJP) in 2000, Laxman Majhi of INC in 1995, Chaitanya Prasad Majhi of Janata Dal (JD) in 1990, Bhabendra Nath Majhi of INC in 1985, Sidhalal Murmu of INC(I) in 1980, and Arjun Majhi of Janata Party (JNP) in 1977.

Rairangpur is part of Mayurbhanj (Lok Sabha constituency).

Notable people

 Droupadi Murmu, 15th President of India.
 Raghunath Murmu, Santali Ol Chiki script inventor, born near Rairangpur

References

 
 http://censusindia.gov.in/NprStateReport.aspx?stcd=21&distcd=07

External links
On Wikimapia  Rairangpur Town all banks, Tourist Places  Full details
 Website for Rairangpur(Mayurbhanj)

Cities and towns in Mayurbhanj district